Hany Guda Ramzy (born 10 March 1969) is an Egyptian football coach and former defender.

Early life 
Ramzy was born in Abdeen region of Cairo to Coptic Orthodox parents. He has one sister, Miriam.

Ramzy began his career at the age of 10. A scout from Tersana club saw him and tried to persuade him to join the youth team in the club but his father Guda Ramzy – one of Al-Ahly's fans – refused to have his son join Tersana or Al-Zamalek clubs.
So his father and his uncle took him to Al Ahly, Captain Mustafa Hussein saw him and decided to put him in the youth club of the red castle. Step by step, Ramzy joined the youth national team at less than 17 years old; Captain Ahamad Rafat was his coach in this time.

Professional career 
Despite his young age, Ramzy's playing ability earned him a spot on Al Ahly's first team. Captain Mahmoud El-Gohary also picked him for the Egyptian National Team's journey to the World Cup in Italy. That was the key of success for the 20-year-old player and soon he became Egypt's youngest professional.

In 1990, he started his professional career with the Swiss club Neuchâtel Xamax, as a centre-half. Swiss media nicknamed him "The Rock".

In summer 1994, Ramzy was the first Egyptian player in the Bundesliga as he joined SV Werder Bremen with a $1.5 million transfer fee to become the most expensive Egyptian player of the time.

After the 1998 African Cup of Nations, Ramzy joined 1. FC Kaiserslautern with fellow Egyptian national Samir Kamouna and wore the number 6. Ramzy was famous in Kaiserslautern as he scored 12 goals from centre-back but in April 2003 after a knee injury, he spent two seasons on the bench until his contract came to an end.

After Kaiserslautern released him, on 19 October 2005, Ramzy signed for 2. Bundesliga club 1. FC Saarbrücken.

During his knee injury, Ramzy started taking lectures about coaching in Berlin. He decided to become a manager after his retirement, so he started as a member in the coaching staff in Kaiserslautern's youth team.

Ramzy returned to Egypt and became the assistant for German coach Rainer Zobel at ENPPI. Due to a lack of success, in January 2007, the club decided to replace Zobel with Ramzy to the end of the season whatever the results were. Ramzy stated that it was a big responsibility and a good step to open the door for young managers in Egypt.

Ending the 2006–07 season in ninth place, Ramzy returned to his original job as assistant coach. The club signed a contract with Anwar Salama, the former manager of Petrol Assiut.

In the middle of September 2008, Ramzy took a new step toward the international training career, he became the assistant manager of the Egyptian under-20 team. He became their head coach a year later.

In December 2009, it was announced that Ramzy had signed a two-year contract as the manager of the Egyptian under-23 team.

Honours

Club
Al Ahly
 Egyptian Premier League: 1988-1989
 Egypt Cup: 1989
 Afro-Asian Cup: 1988

Werder Bremen
 DFL-Supercup: 1994

Individual
 Ramzy named as the 19th Best African player in the last 50 years.
 Named as the 5th Best African Footballer by France football 1990.
 Named as the 9th Best African Footballer by CAF  2000 and CAF 2001.
 Named as the Best Libero in the 1992 African Nations Cup.
 Named as the Best Defensive Midfielder defender in the 2002 African Nations Cup.
 Ramzy once held an Egyptian record as he played five consecutive African Nations Cups in years 1994, 1996, 1998, 2000 and 2002. But this record has been broken by teammate Ahmed Hassan, who has played in 8 consecutive African Nations Cups, which is an Egyptian and African record.

See also
 List of men's footballers with 100 or more international caps

References

External links 
 Egypt's Christian Captain
 Hany Ramzy – Century of International Appearances
 

Living people
1969 births
Footballers from Cairo
Association football defenders
Egyptian footballers
Coptic Orthodox Christians from Egypt
Egyptian expatriate footballers
Egypt international footballers
Neuchâtel Xamax FCS players
SV Werder Bremen players
1. FC Kaiserslautern players
1. FC Saarbrücken players
1990 FIFA World Cup players
1999 FIFA Confederations Cup players
1992 African Cup of Nations players
1994 African Cup of Nations players
1996 African Cup of Nations players
1998 African Cup of Nations players
2000 African Cup of Nations players
2002 African Cup of Nations players
Bundesliga players
2. Bundesliga players
Swiss Super League players
Expatriate footballers in Germany
Egyptian expatriate sportspeople in Switzerland
FIFA Century Club
Lierse S.K. managers
ENPPI SC managers
Al Ittihad Alexandria Club managers
Egyptian football managers
Expatriate football managers in Belgium
Wadi Degla SC managers
Expatriate football managers in the United Arab Emirates
Egyptian expatriate sportspeople in Germany
Egyptian expatriate sportspeople in the United Arab Emirates
Egyptian expatriate sportspeople in Belgium